John Oakes may refer to:

 John Milton Oakes (c. 1442–1485/86), English businessman
 John Wright Oakes (1820–1887), English painter
 John Bertram Oakes (1913–2001), American journalist
 Jackie Oakes (1919–1995), Scottish footballer
 John Oakes (apologist), Christian apologist
 John Cogswell Oakes (1906–1982), United States Army general
 John Waddington Oakes (1932–2021), British military officer and Olympic alpine skier